The Diocese of San Bernardino is a Latin Church ecclesiastical territory or diocese in Southern California. Erected by Pope Paul VI on July 14, 1978, and its jurisdiction extends over San Bernardino and Riverside counties. The territory to form the Diocese of San Bernardino was taken from the Diocese of San Diego. , the diocese has 92 parishes and 12 missions in its territory. Its cathedral is Our Lady of the Rosary Cathedral in San Bernardino. 

The diocese has become well known as one of the leaders among Catholic dioceses in implementing the "parish coordinator" model of parish leadership. The Diocese of San Bernardino is a suffragan diocese in the ecclesiastical province of the metropolitan Archdiocese of Los Angeles.

Demographics
In 2019 the Diocese claimed that there were 1,740,655 Catholics in its territory, a reported 22,000 increase from the previous year. If the numbers are correct it would make San Bernardino the fifth largest Catholic diocese in terms of population in the United States. The main cause of this increase is thought to be the increasing migration of Hispanics to the area in part due to the economic opportunities and affordable housing in comparison to the rest of California.

Bishops

Bishops of San Bernardino
 Phillip Francis Straling (1978–1995), appointed Bishop of Reno
 Gerald Richard Barnes (1995–2020)
 Alberto Rojas (2020–present)

Coadjutor Bishops 
 Alberto Rojas (2019–2020)

Auxiliary Bishops
 Gerald Richard Barnes (1992–1995)
 Dennis Patrick O'Neil (2001–2003)
 Rutilio del Riego Jáñez (2005–2015)

High schools
 Aquinas High School, San Bernardino
 Notre Dame High School, Riverside
 Xavier College Preparatory High School, Palm Desert
 Our Lady of the Desert School, Yucca Valley, not associated with the Diocese, though offers traditional Catholic education.

See also
 Catholic Church by country
 Catholic Church hierarchy
 List of the Catholic dioceses of the United States

References

External links
 

 
Organizations based in San Bernardino County, California
San Bernardino
San Bernardino
Culture of San Bernardino, California
Religion in Riverside County, California
Christian organizations established in 1978
San Bernardino